Barlow is a civil parish in the North East Derbyshire district of Derbyshire, England.  The parish contains 18 listed buildings that are recorded in the National Heritage List for England.  Of these, three are listed at Grade II*, the middle of the three grades, and the others are at Grade II, the lowest grade.  The parish contains the village of Barlow and the surrounding countryside, mainly to the west of the village.  It is almost entirely rural, and the listed buildings are mainly houses and associated structures, farmhouses and farm buildings.  The other listed buildings are a church, its former rectory, a bridge, a former school, a pinfold, and a village pump.


Key

Buildings

References

Citations

Sources

 

Lists of listed buildings in Derbyshire